2015 Damallsvenskan was the 27th season of the Swedish women's association football top division, Damallsvenskan. It was played between 11 April 2015 and 18 October 2015. FC Rosengård were the defending champions, having won the competition in 2014. They successfully defended their title and together with Eskilstuna United qualified for the 2016–17 UEFA Women's Champions League.

AIK and Hammarby were relegated to the 2016 Elitettan.

Teams 

Tyresö FF and Jitex BK were relegated at the end of the 2014 season after finishing in the bottom two places of the table. They were replaced by Elitettan top-two teams Mallbackens IF and Hammarby IF DFF.

Note: 1 According to each club information page at the Swedish Football Association website for Damallsvenskan.

League table

Results

Season statistics

Top scorers

Top assists

References

External links 

Season at soccerway.com

Damallsvenskan seasons
1
Dam
Sweden